Marcello Mancosu (born 15 April 1992) is an Italian footballer who plays as a forward for Tuttocuoio.

Career
Born in Cagliari, Sardinia, Mancosu started his career at Cagliari Calcio, where his elder brother Matteo was a member of the first team in 2007–08 season. Mancosu was a player for their under–17 team in 2008–09 season. He only able to play once for Cagliari's reserves in the next season, on 27 February 2010 (round 18).

Mancosu left for amateur club Selargius in 2010, where he played  seasons in the fifth tier. On 31 January 2014 Mancosu was signed by fellow Sardinian club Trapani. However, he was immediately farmed to Lega Pro Prima Divisione from the Serie B club, unable to play along with his eldest brother Matteo who was a member of Trapani's first team (until January 2015). On 23 July Marcello left for another Lega Pro club Gubbio. Mancosu brothers received call-up to 2014 pre-season camp on 12 July.

In July 2015 Mancosu was signed by Lumezzane, his third Lega Pro club.

On 22 August Mancosu remained in the third tier, signing for Lupa Roma.

Personal life
Mancosu is the youngest brother of fellow footballers Matteo and Marco.

References

External links
 
 

Italian footballers
Cagliari Calcio players
Trapani Calcio players
F.C. Pavia players
A.S. Gubbio 1910 players
F.C. Lumezzane V.G.Z. A.S.D. players
A.C. Tuttocuoio 1957 San_Miniato players
Serie C players
Association football midfielders
Sportspeople from Cagliari
Footballers from Sardinia
1992 births
Living people